Dysoxylum pachyphyllum is a small tree in the family Meliaceae, endemic to Lord Howe Island. It grows at all altitudes on the island, up to 15 metres tall.

References

External links

pachyphyllum
Endemic flora of Lord Howe Island
Trees of Australia
Sapindales of Australia
Taxa named by William Hemsley (botanist)
Plants described in 1907